GR 8 may refer to:

GR 8 (galaxy), a dwarf irregular galaxy
GR 8 (path), a hiking trail
GR-8, Greek National Road 8, usually abbreviated "EO8"

See also
 GR8 and Gr8, an abbreviation of "great" in SMS language